Angelo Cemmi was a member of the Italian Christian Democracy, and was an Italian Senator from Lombardy. He retired in 1963.

Political career
Cemmi, mayor of Darfo in office, entered in the Italian Senate in 1948. He retired after two re-elections.

Role in the Senate

Committee assignments

Electoral history

See also
Italian Senate election in Lombardy, 1948

Footnotes

External links

Site

1908 births
Members of the Italian Senate from Lombardy
Christian Democracy (Italy) politicians
20th-century Italian politicians
Members of the Senate of the Republic (Italy)
Year of death missing
People from Darfo Boario Terme